Tiziano Treu (born 22 August 1939) is an Italian politician and academic, former Minister of Labour and Social Security and Minister of Transports, and current president of the National Council for Economics and Labour.

Biography 
Treu graduated in law at the Università Cattolica del Sacro Cuore in Milan, where he then began teaching labour law. In his student years, he attended the Augustinianum College, where he met Romano Prodi and Giovanni Maria Flick. Prior to the 1990s, Treu had been close to the democratic-reformist wing of the Italian Socialist Party (PSI).

In 1995 he was nominated Minister of Labour and Social Security in the Dini Cabinet. In 1996 he was elected Deputy as an exponent of Lamberto Dini's Italian Renewal (RI), and was confirmed as the head of the ministry in the Prodi I Cabinet, and then became Minister of Transport in the subsequent D'Alema I Cabinet.

On 24 June 1997, Treu, as Minister of Labour, proposed a delegated law, later named Pacchetto Treu, made with the intention of fight unemployment: with this law temporary agency work obtained legislative recognition from the Italian legal system.

Once the political season of The Olive Tree ended, Treu occupied a marginal role in the Parliament, being however elected to the Senate in 2001 and in 2006 with The Daisy (La Margherita; DL) and in 2008 with the Democratic Party (PD).

In 2013, with the end of his parliamentary mandate, Treu became a member of the National Council for Economics and Labour, an assembly of experts that advises the Italian government, the Parliament and the regions, and promotes legislative initiatives on economic and social matters, and in 2017 he was named president of the assembly by the Gentiloni Cabinet, tough, on the occasion of the constitutional referendum of 2016, he voted to suppress it.

In addition to this, in September 2014, Treu was named by the Renzi Cabinet as Special Commissioner of National Institute of Social Security (INPS), until the election of Tito Boeri as president.

References

External links 
Files about his parliamentary activities (in Italian): XIII, XIV, XV, XVI legislature

1939 births
Living people
People from Vicenza
Italian Renewal politicians
20th-century Italian politicians
21st-century Italian politicians
Transport ministers of Italy
Italian Ministers of Labour